Rodney Begnaud (born October 12, 1970) is an American professional wrestler and mixed martial artist, better known by the ring name Rodney Mack. He is signed to  National Wrestling Alliance (NWA). He is best known for his time with WWE .

Professional wrestling career

Training and independent circuit (1998–2002)
After training with the Junkyard Dog, Begnaud made his professional wrestling debut in 1998 as Redd Dogg, and began competing for Southwestern independent promotions.

Extreme Championship Wrestling (2000)
After working on the independent circuit, Mack signed on with Extreme Championship Wrestling in 2000, making his debut as a member of Da Baldies, a stable of members who all had bald heads.

World Wrestling Entertainment (2002–2004)
After ECW's closure, Begnaud was signed by World Wrestling Entertainment and was assigned to their developmental territory Ohio Valley Wrestling. While in OVW, Begnaud formed a tag team with Shelton Benjamin called The Dogg Pound. Together, The Dogg Pound won their first and only Southern Tag Team Championship on July 17, 2002. Begnaud, under his Redd Dogg ring name, then made his televised WWE debut on the January 16, 2003 episode of SmackDown!. He was placed alongside John Cena in an enforcer role, replacing Bull Buchanan, who was betrayed by Cena. After only one appearance on the SmackDown! brand, Begnaud was immediately moved over to the Raw brand and was subsequently renamed Rodney Mack. He made his Raw debut by attacking D'Lo Brown on an episode of Sunday Night Heat, with Theodore Long switching his managerial services from Brown to Mack.

Mack restarted Theodore Long's Thuggin' And Buggin' Enterprises stable, which eventually turned into a group of African Americans who worked a race angle in which they felt they were victims of racism and were being held down by "The Man". Jazz later joined the group in April. As part of the race angle, Mack often competed in a "White Boy Challenge" on Raw, where he would proceed to squash white wrestlers. However, his undefeated streak in the White Boy Challenges was ended on June 23 when he was defeated by Goldberg in under 30 seconds. After the White Boy Challenge was scrapped due to his loss, Mack subsequently formed a tag team with Christopher Nowinski upon Nowinski's inclusion within the stable despite him being white, with Nowinski claiming that he was also held down by "The Man" because of his intelligence. Together, Mack and Nowinski found some success as a tag team, their most notable victory being against the Dudley Boyz at Bad Blood on June 15. The team continued until Nowinski suffered an injury and was diagnosed with post-concussion syndrome, which subsequently resulted in his retirement soon after.

To replace Nowinski, Theodore Long announced that Mark Henry would become Mack's new tag team partner. Despite only being a team for short while, Mack and Henry were fairly successful and scored some upset victories over some prominent tag teams.

In November 2003, Mack suffered a knee injury which prevented him from wrestling. He was supposed to return to action between March and June 2004, but was sent back to OVW and worked Raw dark matches throughout June and July 2004. Mack made his return to WWE television on July 26, 2004, where he participated in an over the top rope battle royal for an opportunity to compete for the World Heavyweight Championship.

On November 4, Mack was released from his contract along with a few others, including his wife Jazz.

Return to the independent circuit (2005–2007)
After his release, Begnaud began competing on the independent circuit, most prominently for in NWA Cyberspace. In late 2005, Begnaud and Jazz opened Dirtysouth Championship Wrestling, an independent promotion based in Louisiana. However, DCW would be renamed Downsouth Championship Wrestling due to copyright issues in early 2006 before ceasing operations in early 2007.

Return to WWE (2006–2007)
On September 15, 2006, it was reported on WWE.com that Begnaud, along with Marty Jannetty and Brad Armstrong, had been hired by WWE. He started wrestling at ECW house shows on September 30, 2006. On January 18, 2007, Mack along with several other superstars (including his wife Jazz) were again released by WWE.

Second return to the independent circuit (2007–2008, 2011–present)
After leaving WWE, Begnaud would make sporadic appearances on the independent circuit under his Rodney Mack ring name before winning the All-American Wrestling Tag Team Championship with Heidenreich on May 18, 2008 after defeating Latinos Locos. However, the title was vacated soon after due to interference in the original title match.

After a 3 year hiatus due to the birth of his twins, on June 11, 2011, Begnaud wrestled for the first time in three years and, under his Rodney Mack ring name, he defeated Brad Michaels in a match for NWA Oklahoma. Exactly six months later, Mack defeated Faroh of Phunk to win the NWA Mississippi Heavyweight Championship, his first championship in over nine years. On February 10, 2012, Mack wrestled Scot Summers for the NWA Texas Heavyweight Championship, but was unsuccessful in regaining the title. Following this, Mack would go on to lose the NWA Mississippi Heavyweight Title to Cale Conners on March 18.
Mack made an appearance at a Southeast Championship Wrestling charity event in Greenville, Mississippi.

On May 21, 2016, Mack defeated Scott McKenzie to become the AIWF Southwest Champion in Athens, TX. Through 2016 and 2017, Mack mainly competed for the National Wrestling Alliance (NWA). In 2018 and in 2019 he has primarily appeared for Anarcy Championship Wrestling.

Mixed martial arts
Begnaud, under his Rodney Mack ring name, made his mixed martial arts debut on June 7, 2008, knocking out Joe Nameth by ground-and-pound in 21 seconds in the first round. He lost his second match with Andrew Staples via submission by a rear naked choke.

Mixed martial arts record 

|Loss
|align=center|1–1
|	Andrew Staples
|Submission (Rear-Naked Choke)
|	Gladiator Promotions - Summer Knockouts
|
|align=center|1
|align=center|4:38
|Louisiana, United States
|
|-
|Win
|align=center|1–0
|Joe Nameth
|TKO (Punches)
|USA MMA - Lafayette vs. The World
|
|align=center|1
|align=center|0:21
|Lafayette, LA
|
|-

Personal life

He is married to fellow former WWE wrestler Carlene "Jazz" Moore. In November 2008, the couple had twin girls named Summer and Skye.

Begnaud also runs a professional wrestling school with his wife and Thunder Rosa called "The Dogg Pound".

In July 2016, Begnaud was named part of a class action lawsuit filed against WWE which alleged that wrestlers incurred traumatic brain injuries during their tenure and that the company concealed the risks of injury.  The suit was litigated by attorney Konstantine Kyros, who has been involved in a number of other lawsuits against WWE. US District Judge Vanessa Lynne Bryant dismissed the lawsuit in September 2018.

Championships and accomplishments 
Allied Independent Wrestling Federations
AIWF World Heavyweight Championship (1 time)
AIWF Southwest Championship (1 time)
All American Wrestling (Louisiana)
AAW Tag Team Championship (1 time) – with Heidenreich
Elite Championship Wrestling
NWA Elite Heavyweight Championship (1 time)
Insane Hardcore Wrestling/Iconic Heroes of Wrestling Entertainment
IHW Heavyweight Championship (1 time)
IHWE Triple Crown Championship (1 time)
Lonestar Championship Wrestling
LCW Heavyweight Championship (1 time)
NWA Mississippi
NWA Mississippi Heavyweight Championship (1 time)
NWA Southwest
NWA Texas Heavyweight Championship (3 times)
NWA Velocity
IPCW Heavyweight Championship (1 time)
Ohio Valley Wrestling
OVW Southern Tag Team Championship (1 time) – with Shelton Benjamin
Pro Wrestling Illustrated
Ranked No. 85 of the top 500 singles wrestlers of the year in the PWI 500 in 2003
Southwest Wrestling Entertainment
SWE Television Championship (1 time)
SWE Tag Team Championships (1 time) – with Jaykus Pliskin
SWE Six Man Tag Team Championship (1 time) – with Charlie Haas and Max Castellanos
Texas Championship Wrestling
TCW Heavyweight Championship (1 time)
Texas Outlaw Wrestling
TOP Southern Heavyweight Championship (1 time, current)
Texas Wrestling Hall of Fame
Class of 2011
Velocity Championship Action
VCA Heavyweight Championship (2 times)
VooDoo Wrestling
VooDoo Championship (1 time)
World Class Revolution
WCR Tag Team Championships (1 time) – with Dyl Dempsey
World Wrestling Xpress
WWX Heavyweight Championship (1 time)

References

External links
 

1970 births
20th-century professional wrestlers
21st-century professional wrestlers
Living people
American male professional wrestlers
American male mixed martial artists
Mixed martial artists utilizing wrestling
People from Lafayette, Louisiana
Professional wrestlers from Louisiana